Wayne Gallman Jr. (born October 1, 1994) is an American football running back who is a free agent. He played college football at Clemson and contributed to win the CFP national championship (2017) before being drafted in the fourth round of the 2017 NFL Draft by the New York Giants.

Early years
Gallman attended Grayson High School in Loganville, Georgia, where he played high school football. He was teammates with Robert Nkemdiche and Austin Meadows of the Tampa Bay Rays. He was rated by Rivals.com as a three-star recruit and committed to Clemson University to play college football.

College career
Gallman attended and played college football for Clemson from 2013–2016. He redshirted during his first year at Clemson in 2013. Gallman played in all 13 games in 2014 as a redshirt freshman and made nine starts. He made his collegiate debut in a loss at Georgia. On October 18, 2014, in a game against Boston College, he scored his first collegiate rushing touchdown. On October 6, he had 106 rushing yards, one rushing touchdown, 43 receiving yards, and one receiving touchdown in a breakout performance against Wake Forest. In the regular season finale against South Carolina, he had 191 rushing yards and a rushing touchdown in the annual rivalry game. He finished the season with 769 yards on 161 carries and four touchdowns.

Gallman entered his sophomore year in 2015 as the starter. As a redshirt sophomore in 2015, Gallman played in 14 games. In the season opener against Wofford, he had 92 rushing yards and two rushing touchdowns. On Halloween, against North Carolina State, he had 172 rushing yards and a rushing touchdown. In the ACC Conference Championship against North Carolina, he had 187 rushing yards, one rushing touchdown, and four receptions for 68 receiving yards and a receiving touchdown as part of a strong performance. Clemson's successful season qualified them for the College Football Playoff. In the Orange Bowl against Oklahoma in the National Semifinals, he had 150 rushing yards and two rushing touchdowns in the victory. In the 2016 College Football Playoff National Championship against Alabama, he had 45 rushing yards and a rushing touchdown to go along with three receptions for 61 yards in the 45–40 loss. Overall, he finished the season with 1,514 rushing yards and 13 touchdowns.

As a redshirt junior in 2016, Gallman played 15 games with 1,133 rushing yards and 17 touchdowns. In the season opener, he had 123 rushing yards and a touchdown in the victory at Auburn. On November 12, against Pittsburgh, he was held to 36 rushing yards but had three rushing touchdowns in Clemson's lone loss of the season. He bounced back in the next game with 161 rushing yards and two rushing touchdowns in the victory at Wake Forest. Clemson returned to the College Football Playoff that year. In the Fiesta Bowl against Ohio State in the National Semifinals, he had 85 rushing yards and a rushing touchdown. He was part of the Clemson team that defeated Alabama in the 2017 College Football Playoff National Championship by a score of 35–31. In the game, he had 18 carries for 46 yards and touchdown. In addition, he had three receptions for 39 yards After the 2016 season, Gallman decided to forgo his senior year and enter the 2017 NFL Draft.

Collegiate statistics

Professional career

New York Giants

Gallman was drafted by the New York Giants in the fourth round, 140th overall, in the 2017 NFL Draft. He was the 14th running back selected in that year's draft. Gallman made his NFL debut and scored his first NFL touchdown on October 1, 2017, in a loss to the Tampa Bay Buccaneers.  This game coincided with his 23rd birthday. Overall, in his rookie season, he finished with 476 rushing yards to go along with 34 receptions for 193 receiving yards and a receiving touchdown. Gallman scored his first rushing touchdown in Week 17 against the Dallas Cowboys on a one-yard run. Overall, he finished the 2018 season with 176 rushing yards and rushing touchdown.

In Week 4 of the 2019 season against the Washington Redskins, Gallman made his first start of the season due to an injury by Saquon Barkley. In the game, Gallman rushed 18 times for 63 yards and a touchdown and caught six passes for 55 yards and a touchdown in the 24–3 win. Overall, Gallman finished the 2019 season with 29 carries for 110 rushing yards and two rushing touchdowns to go along with 11 receptions for 102 receiving yards and one receiving touchdown.

Gallman began the 2020 season as a backup to Barkley, but became the starting running back after Barkley was placed on injured reserve after Week 2. In Week 10 of the 2020 season against the Philadelphia Eagles, Gallman rushed 15 times for 53 yards and rushed for a career high two touchdowns in a 27–17 win. In Week 13 against the Seattle Seahawks, Gallman rushed for 135 yards during the 17–12 win. Gallman finished the 2020 season with career highs with 147 carries for 682 yards and 6 touchdowns along with 34 receptions for 193 yards and one receiving touchdown. Gallman became a free agent after the year.

San Francisco 49ers 
On April 21, 2021, Gallman signed a one-year contract with the San Francisco 49ers. On August 31, 2021, the 49ers released Gallman.

Atlanta Falcons 
On September 2, 2021, Gallman signed with the Atlanta Falcons. 
 He was released on December 11, 2021.

Minnesota Vikings 
On December 13, 2021, Gallman was claimed off waivers by the Minnesota Vikings.

Kansas City Chiefs 
Gallman signed with the practice squad of the Kansas City Chiefs on October 12, 2022. He was released on November 29, 2022.

Seattle Seahawks 
Gallman signed with the practice squad of the Seattle Seahawks on December 6, 2022. He was released on December 15, 2022. He was re-signed on December 20, 2022.  His practice squad contract with the team expired after the season on January 14, 2023.

References

External links

Kansas City Chiefs bio
Clemson Tigers bio

1994 births
Living people
21st-century African-American sportspeople
People from Loganville, Georgia
Sportspeople from the Atlanta metropolitan area
Players of American football from Georgia (U.S. state)
African-American players of American football
American football running backs
Clemson Tigers football players
Kansas City Chiefs players
New York Giants players
San Francisco 49ers players
Atlanta Falcons players
Minnesota Vikings players
Seattle Seahawks players